During the 1992–93 English football season, Leicester City F.C. competed in the Football League First Division.

Season summary
Leicester suffered another playoff final defeat at the end of the 1992–93 Division One campaign. They managed to draw level with Swindon Town in the second half after trailing 3–0, only to concede another controversial penalty as they did in last season's play-off final.

Final league table

Results
Leicester City's score comes first

Legend

Football League First Division

First Division play-offs

16 May 1993: Play-off semi final 1st leg against Portsmouth played at City Ground due to reconstruction work at Filbert Street

FA Cup

League Cup

Anglo-Italian Cup

Squad

Left club during the season

References

Leicester City F.C. seasons
Leicester City